Tünek Tepe is a hill in the west side of the city of Antalya. It's height is 618 metres (2027 feet).

On the crest is a hotel, revolving restaurant called "Döner Gazino" (literally "Rotating Club") and an observation terrace featuring a view of Gulf of Antalya, city and surrounding mountains.

Tünektepe Cable Car 

The Tünektepe Cable Car is an aerial lift of tramway type located in Antalya, Turkey, serving the peak of Tünek Tepe hill. Cable car ride takes 15 minutes one way.

The Cable Car project was initiated in 2013 as a project to connect Tünek Tepe, the coastal hill overlooking the city of Antalya, with the Sarısu Neighborhood at the edge of the Konyaaltı district. The project cost 14 million Turkish lira.

References 

Tourist attractions in Antalya